A Torn Lily is a 1953 Hong Kong black-and-white costume film written and directed by Yuen Yang-an, based on the traditional story of Wang Kui Betrays Guiying. The film was produced by Great Wall Movie Enterprises and stars their 20-year-old starlet Xia Meng (19 at the time of filming) in the lead role.

It became the first Hong Kong film to compete in an international festival when it entered the 7th Edinburgh International Film Festival in 1953, though it represented China. It is also likely the first Hong Kong film released in the People's Republic of China, where it drew an audience of over 8.7 million viewers on 16347 screens in December 1954, about 22 months after it was released in Hong Kong. It is currently kept at the Hong Kong Film Archive.

Cast

Xia Meng as Jiao Guiying, a courtesan
Dai Lei as Jiao Guiying (child)
Ping Fan as Wang Kui, a scholar
Shek Hwei as Xiao Ju, Guiying's friend
Su Qin as Wang Zhong, the servant
Sun Zhijun as Jin Lei
Li Ciyu as Minister Xie
Gam Sha as Zhang Xingjian
Cao Yan as Zhang Qian
Chang Tseng as Nobleman Kou
Chan Ching-po as Wandering Singer
Shi Lei as Prime Minister Han
Chi Ching
Wen Yi-min
Huang Fan
Wong Chun
Chu Li
Cheung Ho

Reception
Raymond Durgnat wrote a not very flattering review in Sight & Sound (Vol. 24–25), calling Chinese films (along with Japanese films and Vsevolod Pudovkin's films) too "theatrical". But he called the first half of the film "beautifully evoked".

References

External links

Hong Kong black-and-white films
Hong Kong drama films
Films set in the Song dynasty
1953 drama films